Giovanni Battista Lama (1673–1748) was an Italian painter of the Baroque period, active mainly in Naples. He primarily painted historical canvases. Along with Paolo de Matteis, he was pupil to the painter Luca Giordano. In turn, the painter Antonio Capulongo was his pupil.

References

1673 births
1748 deaths
17th-century Italian painters
Italian male painters
18th-century Italian painters
Painters from Naples
Italian Baroque painters
18th-century Italian male artists